Makran (also Romanized as Mākrān and Mākerān) is a village in Gahrbaran-e Jonubi Rural District, Gahrbaran District, Miandorud County, Mazandaran Province, Iran. At the 2006 census, its population was 1,601, in 448 families.

References 

Populated places in Miandorud County